Raúl Marcelo Vázquez (born 16 January 1948) is a Cuban former cyclist. He competed at the 1968, 1972 and the 1976 Summer Olympics.

References

External links
 

1948 births
Living people
Cuban male cyclists
Olympic cyclists of Cuba
Cyclists at the 1968 Summer Olympics
Cyclists at the 1972 Summer Olympics
Cyclists at the 1976 Summer Olympics
Place of birth missing (living people)
Pan American Games medalists in cycling
Pan American Games silver medalists for Cuba
Cyclists at the 1979 Pan American Games